Arthur Schafer is a Canadian ethicist specializing in bioethics, philosophy of law, social philosophy and political philosophy. He is Director of the Centre for Professional and Applied Ethics, at the University of Manitoba.
He is also a full professor in the Department of Philosophy and an ethics consultant for the Department of Paediatrics and Child Health at the Health Sciences Centre in Winnipeg.  For ten years he was head of the Section of Bio-Medical Ethics in the Faculty of Medicine of the University of Manitoba.  He has also served as visiting scholar at Green College, Oxford.

Schafer has received a number of awards and honours.  He is a Canadian Commonwealth Scholar, Honorary Woodrow Wilson Scholar, a Canada Council Fellow.  At the University of Manitoba he has received the Stanton Teaching Excellence Award, the Campbell Award for University Outreach, and the University Teaching Service Award for Teaching Excellence.

Schafer has published widely in the fields of moral, social, and political philosophy.  He is author of The Buck Stops Here: Reflections on moral responsibility, democratic accountability and military values, and co-editor of Ethics and Animal Experimentation.  His curriculum vitae lists more than 90 scholarly articles and book chapters, covering a wide range of topics, with a special focus on issues in professional and bio-medical ethics, business and environmental ethics.  Professor Schafer is National Research Associate of the Canadian Centre for Policy Alternatives, which has published two of his Reports. He has made several hundred conference presentations in Canada and abroad, and has written dozens of newspaper articles for The Globe and Mail, The Toronto Star, The Winnipeg Free Press, The Medical Post, and The Sunday Times (London).

Schafer has been a frequent guest on CBC radio and television, including many appearances on CBC radio's Morningside, This Morning and The Current, As It Happens, Sunday Morning, and Cross Country Check Up; and CBC television's The National, The Journal, The National Magazine, and Newsworld.  He has also appeared frequently on The Discovery Network's "@Discovery.ca", discussing ethical and value aspects of medicine, science and technology; and on the CTV, WTN, Global and Baton television networks.

Works

Selected articles & book chapters

"Citizen Participation: Democratic Elitism and Participatory Democracy", The Allocative Conflicts in Water Resource Management, ed. Dixon Thomson, University of Manitoba Press, 1974.

"Privacy: A Philosophical Overview", Aspects of Privacy Law, ed. D. Gibson, Butterworth, 1980.

--- Reprinted in: Reader on Legal Theory, Captus University Publications, York University, Toronto, 1993.

"Moral Fanaticism: The Utilitarian's Nightmare? ", Journal of Social Philosophy, v. XII, n. 1, Jan., 1981.
   
"The Ethics of the Randomized Clinical Trial", The New England Journal of Medicine, Sept. 16, 1982.

"Experimentation with Human Subjects: A Critique of the Views of Hans Jonas", Journal of Medical Ethics, 1983.

"Consent to Randomized Treatment: A Reply to Brewin", Canadian Medical Association Journal, v. 129, Jul. 15, 1983.

"Obedience to Law: A Socio-Political Context", Law in a Cynical Society, eds. Gibson and Baldwin, Carswell, 1985.

"Legislating 'Death With Dignity'", Humane Medicine, v. I,  n. 1, 1985.
 
"The Randomized Clinical Trial: For Whose Benefit?", IRB: A Review of Human Subjects Research, v. 7, n. 2, Mar/Apr, 1985.

"The Use of Placebos in Randomized Clinical Trials", IRB: A Review of Human Subjects Research, v. 7, n. 2, Mar/Apr, 1985.

"Medical Secrecy: Patient's Right of Access to Medical Records", Humane Medicine, autumn, 1985.

"On Using Nazi Data: The Case Against", Dialogue, v. XXV, 1986.

"Nurses New Role: Patients' Advocate", The Arch of Experience, eds. I.W.Mills and J.Mills, Holt, Rinehart and Winston Ltd., 1987.

"Civil Liberties and the Elderly Patient, Ethics and Aging", Ethics and Aging, ed. E.Winkler, University of British Columbia Press, 1988.

"What Ethics Is Not", Journal of the Canadian Dental Association, v. 55, n. 4, Feb., 1989.
   
"AIDS: The Social Dimension", Perspectives on AIDS: Ethical and Social Issues, ed. C. Overall, Oxford University Press, 1991.

"The market-place and the community", Scholarly Publishing, University of Toronto Press, v. 24, n. 4, 1993.

"Is reasonable access what we want? ", International Journal of Health Services, v. 24, n. 2, 1994.

Ethics of Animal and Human Experimentation, eds. P. P. De Deyn, R. D'Hooge, R. Clara, and A. Schafer, John Libbey Co.Ltd., London, 1995.

Down and out in Winnipeg and Toronto: the ethics of legislating against panhandling. Caledon Institute, 1999.

"A wink and a nod: a conceptual map of responsibility and accountability in bureaucratic organizations", 
Canadian Public Administration/Administration Publique du Canada, v., 42, n. 1., 1999.

"Inmate voting rights: two recent Canadian cases", Queen Mary Law Journal (University of London), Oct., 1999.

"Research on elderly subjects: Striking the Right Balance", Aging: Decisions at the End of Life, 
eds. David N. Weisstub, David C. Thomasma, Serge Gauthier, and George F. Tomossy. Klewer Academic Press International Library of Ethics, Law and the New Medicine 171-205. 2001.

"Bedside Rationing by Physicians: the case against", Healthcare Papers, v. 2, n 2., 45-52. 2001.

"The Great Canadian Health Care Debate: values in conflict", Report for the Canadian Centre for Policy Alternatives, autumn 2002.

"Waiting for Romanow: Canada’s health care values under fire". Report commissioned and published by the Canadian Centre for Policy Alternatives. Sept., 2002. 1-15.

"Biomedical conflicts of interest: a defence of the sequestration thesis", Journal of Medical Ethics, 30, 2004. 8-24.
 
"Olivieri Redux: Science scandal or ethics scandal?", v. 21, n. 2, Jan., 2007.

The expressive liberty of beggars, Report: The Canadian Centre for Policy Alternatives, autumn, 2007.
 
"Panhandling", The Canadian Centre for Policy Alternatives Monitor, 2007.
 
"Biomedical conflicts of interest", Bioethics: The International Library of Essays in Public and Professional Ethics, ed. Justin Oakley. Ashgate Publishing Ltd., London. 2008.

"Canadian Internet Pharmacies: Some ethical issues", Canadian Pharmacists Journal, winter, 141, 2008. 191-7.

"The University as Corporate Handmaiden: Who’re ya gonna trust? ", The Universities at Risk: How Politics, Special Interests, and Corporatization Threaten Academic Integrity, ed. Jim Turk. James Lorimer and Co, Toronto, 2008.
   
"Learning how not to do the drug industry tango: an essay on student awareness of conflict of interest", Arthur Schafer and Nancy Olivieri in Understanding and Responding to Pharmaceutical Promotion, ed. Barbara Mintzes, World Health Organization and Health Action International. 1st Ed., 2009.

"Whose bread you eat, his song you sing: why doctors and researchers should take a pass on drug industry money", Canadian Dimension, January–February, 2010.

“Social Limits to Growth: If everyone stands on tiptoe, No one sees better”, Canadian Dimension, Vol. 46, No. 2, Mar/Apr 2012, pp. 31-35.

“Physician Assisted Suicide: The Great Canadian Euthanasia Debate, International Journal of Law and Psychiatry, Vol. 36, Issues 5-6, September-December 2013, pp.522-531.

“The first loser: some reflections on sports ethics”, Canadian Dimension, Vol. 47, #2 July/August, 2013.“The death debate: Is the assisted-suicide ruling a victory or a dangerous step backward?”, in Ethical Reasoning in Criminal Justice and Public Safety (4th edition), eds. David R. Evans and Craig S. MacMillan. Edmond Montgomery Publications Ltd. (Toronto). 2013.

“Apprendre à ne pas faire le jeu d’industrie pharmaceutique: prendre conscience des conflicts d’interets”, in Comprendre la promotion pharmaceutique et y répondre, Haute Autorité de la Santé, Government of France. 2013, pp.107-126.

Pseudo-Evidence Based Medicine: When Biomedical Research Becomes an Adjunct of Pharmaceutical Marketing”. In Free Knowledge¸ eds. Patricia W. Elliott and Daryl Hepting, University of Regina Press, 2015, pp. 26-42

Selected newspaper commentaries

"A Great Leap for Humankind? The Dutch legalization of euthanasia", Globe and Mail

"At the end of life, who gets the last word, doctor or family?", Globe and Mail

"Aunt Sophie’s Choice: the perils of paternalism", Globe and Mail

"Ballots Behind Bars: the struggle for prisoners’ right to vote", Globe and Mail

"Beware e-adoptions", Globe and Mail

"Cracking down on medical trials", Toronto Star

"Do it yourself genetic tests: perhaps you should think twice", Globe and Mail

"Doctors, drug companies, and gifts", Globe and Mail

"Drug safety in the cross-hairs", Ottawa Citizen

"Flying saucers, Hitler’s clone and Baby Eve", Winnipeg Free Press

"Globalizing Insecurity: where do we go from here?", Globe and Mail

"Government for Sale", Globe and Mail

"Health Warning: that pig cell may be a Trojan horse", Globe and Mail

"How else are they going to learn?", Globe and Mail

"How not to protect the not-yet born", Globe and Mail

"Human stem cell cloning: How slippery is the slippery slope?", Winnipeg Free Press

"'I don’t think I will ever hold another dying child again...': the case of nurse Proudman", Globe and Mail

"Legalizing assisted suicide in Canada: an idea whose time has come?", Globe and Mail

"Let's use common sense in cases of mercy killing", Winnipeg Free Press

"Online Adoption: does the end justify the means?", Globe and Mail

"Patients before profits", Globe and Mail

"Post-Menopausal Mothers: a case for the defence", Globe and Mail

"Premier Harris and Walkerton: Does ignorance excuse? ", Globe and Mail

"Robert Latimer and the Principles of Punishment", Globe and Mail

"Selling our souls: when medical research dances to the tune of the marketplace", Toronto Star

"Shortening Ashley: Let’s not rush to judgement", Globe and Mail

"Sounding the alarm: what happens when medical journal editors fight back?", Globe and Mail

"Storm in a teacup","Globe and Mail"

"The Case of the Bijani Twins: Why the doctors should have said ‘no’", Globe and Mail

"The ethics of stem cell research", Toronto Star

"The file drawer effect and how to fix it: Why medical journal editors think it’s time for action", Globe and Mail

"The gift that keeps on giving – to the drug industry", Globe and Mail

"The Great Canadian Euthanasia Debate: learning from history", Globe and Mail

"The perils of whistle-blowing", Toronto Star

"The Problem of Panhandling and What Not To Do About It", Globe and Mail

"The Supreme Court and Latimer: where was the wisdom and common sense?", Toronto Star

"The thirteenth man is cheating", Globe and Mail

"Thinking about the ethics of stem cell research", Globe and Mail

"Tsunami ethics: Jillian’s choice", Globe and Mail

"Welcome the good death", Globe and Mail

"When Farm Leaders Meet Agri-Business", Globe and Mail

"Who decides for a teenager? Jehovah’s Witness refusal of life-saving treatment", Globe and Mail

"Who decides for the child? The case of Tyrell Dueck", Globe and Mail

"Who has the right to die for their faith? ", Winnipeg Free Press

"Who sets the limits on our healthcare? ", Winnipeg Free Press

"Who’re Ya Gonna Call? Not the Corporate University", Globe and Mail

"Who’s paying for these steak dinners? Public service and private enrichment", Globe and Mail

"Why Britain issued the first cloning license: How slippery is the slippery slope? ", Globe and Mail

"Why drug-industry funding of university research should be banned", Winnipeg Free Press

"Why should we care? The perils of for-profit medicine", Globe and Mail

The Supreme Court Got It Right, Winnipeg Free Press

Selected reviews

"Ethics the Way Nature Intended" Review of The Ethical Imagination: Journeys of the Human Spirit. Margaret Somerville. House of Anansi Press, 270 pp.

"Faster, Taller, Stronger, Smarter … Better?" Review of Enhancing Evolution: The Ethical Case for Making Better People. John Harris. Princeton University Press, 242 pp.

"Making better babies." Review of The Case against Perfection: ethics in the age of genetic engineering. Michael J. Sandel. Belknap: Harvard. 2007, 162 pp.

"Perils of prozac-popping." Review of Let Them Eat Prozac. David Healy, James Lorimer and Company. 2003, 462 pp.

"Review of A Call to Action: Taking Back Healthcare for Future Generations." Hank McKinnell. McGraw Mill, 217pp.

"Review of A Cross-Cultural Dialogue on Health Care Ethics." Harold Coward and Pinit Ratanakul, eds. Wilfrid Laurier University Press. xii, 274.

"Review of A Darwinian Left: politics, evolution and cooperation." Peter Singer. New Haven: Yale University Press. 2000.

"Review of The Drug Trial: Nancy Olivieri and the Science Scandal that Rocked the Hospital for Sick Children." Miriam Shuchman, Random House, 451 pp.

"Review of The End of Ethics In A Technological Society." Lawrence E. Schmidt with Scott Marratto, McGill-Queen's University Press, 246 pp.

"Review of The Ethical Canary: Science, Society and the Human Spirit." Margaret Somerville. Viking

Other selected articles & book chapters

"The Allocation of Scarce Medical Resources: Some Moral and Value Issues", Journal of the Canadian Dietetic Association, v. 40, n. 1, Jan., 1979.     
 
"Moral Leadership in Health Care", Dimensions in Health Care, Mar., 1980.

"The Ethics of Research on Human Beings: A Critical Review of the Issues and Arguments", Research Advances in Alcohol and Drug Problems, eds. Israels, Kalant, et al., Plenum Press, 1981.

"Clinical Trials: A Reply to Critics", New England Journal of Medicine, v. 308, n. 6, 1983.

"Kontrolieter klinscher Versuch: Dilemma for Artz und Patient", Medical Tribune, n. 13, Freitag 21, Jan., 1983.

"The Right of Institutionalized Psychiatric Patients to Refuse Treatment", Canada's Mental Health, v. 33, n. 3, Sept., 1985.

"Restraints and the Elderly: When Safety and Autonomy Conflict", Canadian Medical Association Journal, v. 132, June 1, 1985.

--- Reprinted in: Psychiatry Digest, n. 2, March, 1986.

"Human Experimentation: A Critical Review", The Quarterly Journal of Biology, Dec., 1986.

"At Liberty and At Risk", Canadian Doctor, May, 1986.

"Reproductive Ethics", Dialogue, v. XXIV, n. 4, winter, 1986.

Bio-medical Ethics, ed. Arthur Schafer, Special Issue of The Journal of Social Philosophy, v. XVIII, n. 1, winter, 1987.

"Privacy", Human Rights and Freedoms in Canada: Cases, Notes, and Materials, eds. Berlin and Pentney. Butterworths, Canada, 1987.

"Caught in a Bind", Canadian Business, v. .60, n. 11, Nov., 1987.

"The Randomized Clinical Trial: A Tragic Dilemma", Proceedings of the Second International Congress On Ethics in Medicine, N.Y., 1987.

"Nurses Define, Not Defy", Canadian Doctor, June, 1987.

"Ethical Issues and Aging", Fiction, Fact and Forecasts. Proceedings of the Fourth Manitoba Conference on Aging. Government of Manitoba, Queen's Printers, 1987.

"On Mice and Men", Canadian Doctor, June, 1987.

"The Death of Public Morality: A Civilization in Decline", Canadian Dimension, May/June, 1987.

"Writing Your Own Ending", Canadian Doctor, Apr., 1987.

"An Assessment of the Winnipeg Group Homes By-Law in Relation to Canadian Democratic Values", Court of Queen's Bench, Province of Manitoba, in the Matter of the City of Winnipeg Act. Expert Evidence.

"Achieving Informed Consent in Clinical Trials", Ethical Dilemmas in Cancer Treatment, ed. B.Stoll, Faber and Faber, London, 1988.

"Morals in the Rat Race", Prose Models: Canadian, American and British Essays, eds. Levin, Rampton, and Lynch. Harcourt, Brace, Jovanovich, 1988.

"Teratology: The Social and Ethical Dimension", Teratology, eds. G-H Schumacher, J.Fanghanel, TV Persaud. Gustav Fischer Verlag, Stuttgart, 1992.

"Teratologie", Teratologie, eds. G-H Schumacher, J.Fanghanel, TV Persaud. Gustave Fischer Verlag, Stuttgart, 1992.

"Dental Ethics: Getting the Balance Right", Journal of the Canadian Dental Association, v. 55, n. 5, Mar., 1989.

"Dental Ethics: Challenge and Crisis", Journal of the Canadian Dental Association, v. 55, n. 6, Apr., 1989.

"The moral challenge of cosmetic dentistry", Journal of the Ontario Dental Association, July/Aug., 1991.

"Informed consent to surgery", Canadian Medical Association Journal, 1991.

"Implementing a DNR Policy: promise and peril", Canadian Journal of Anesthesia, v. 38, n. 5, 1991.

"La mise en place d'une politique de non-reanimation: espoir et perils", Canadian Journal of Anesthesia, v. 38, n. 
5, 1991.

"Some reflections of a non-medical 'outsider'", Calyx: Ethical Issues in Paediatrics, v. 1, n. 4, autumn, 1991.

"From Global to Local: Issues in environmental planning", Proceedings of Laurentian Business-University Environmental Symposium. Laurentian University Press, 1993.

"Sticky wickets: ethical conundrums in development", Case Currents: Journal of the Council for Advancement and Support of Education, July/Aug., 1993.

"When too much isn't enough", in Economics: A Canadian Perspective, James D. Thexton and Charles A. Hawkes, Oxford University Press, 1994.

"The moral anatomy and moral pathology of the randomized clinical trial", Ethics of animal and human experimentation, eds. De Deyn, D'Hooge, Clara and Schafer. John Libbey Co., London, 1995.

"Keeping control over life and death", A Gentle Death, ed. M.Seguin. 1996.

"Prisoners' Right to Vote", Expert Evidence, in the Federal Court of Canada, McCorrister v. The Attorney General of Canada, Trial Division, 1996.

"The Buck Stops Here: reflections on moral responsibility, political accountability and military values", Government of Canada, 1997.

"Le responsable, c'est moi: Reflexions sur la responsabilite morale, l'obligation de rendre compte en democratie et les valeurs militaires", Government of Canada, 1997.

"A Cross-cultural dialogue on health care ethics", The University of Toronto Quarterly, v. 70, n. 1, winter, 2000/2001.

"Medicine, Morals and Money: dancing with porcupines or sleeping beside elephants?", Doctors for Research Integrity, [pamphlet] Toronto, 2002.

"How much right has a beggar to beg?", Write of Way: Essay Strategies and Readings, ed.

"Medicare and our core social values", Canadian Centre for Policy Alternatives Monitor, spring, 2002.

"Human Embryonic Stem Cell Cloning", In the Agora: The Public Face of Canadian Philosophy, eds. Andrew Irvine and John Russell, University of Toronto Press, 2006.

"Tsunami Ethics: Jillian's Choice", In the Agora: The Public Face of Canadian Philosophy, eds. Andrew Irvine and John Russell, University of Toronto Press, 2006.

"Cracking down on Medical Trials", Agora: The Public Face of Canadian Philosophy, eds. Andrew Irvine and John Russell, University of Toronto Press, 2006.

References

External links
Centre for Professional and Applied Ethics
Selected Printable Publications from Arthur Schafer

1942 births
Living people
Canadian philosophers
Canadian political philosophers
Canadian ethicists